Upton is a village and civil parish in the Peterborough district, in the ceremonial county of Cambridgeshire, England. For electoral purposes it forms part of Glinton and Wittering ward in North West Cambridgeshire constituency. The population of the parish is included in the civil parish of Sutton.

The Parish Church of St John the Baptist is a 12th-century Norman church with a north aisle rebuilt in 17th century. It was a chapel-of-ease and was built as a daughter church to  St Kyneburgha's at Castor. The church is a Grade I listed building. It is set in the fields to the east of the village, 100 yards from the Roman King Street.

References

External links
Church website

Villages in Cambridgeshire
Geography of Peterborough
Civil parishes in Cambridgeshire